The Martyrdom of St Magnus is a chamber opera in one act (with nine scenes) by the British composer Peter Maxwell Davies. The libretto, by Davies himself, is based on the novel Magnus by George Mackay Brown. The opera was first performed in St Magnus Cathedral, Kirkwall, Orkney on 18 June 1977.

Roles

Synopsis
The opera tells the story of Magnus Erlendsson, Earl of Orkney, who became a Christian saint and martyr. The nine scenes are entitled: 1. The Battle of Menai Strait; 2. The Temptations of Magnus; 3. The Curse of Blind Mary; 4. The Peace Parley; 5.Magnus's Journey to the Isle of Egilsay; 6.Earl Hakon plots to murder Magnus; 7. The Reporters; 8. The Sacrifice; 9. The Miracle.

References

Further reading
Holden, Amanda (ed.), The New Penguin Opera Guide, New York: Penguin Putnam, 2001. 

Operas
Operas by Peter Maxwell Davies
English-language operas
Chamber operas
One-act operas
1977 operas
Operas based on novels
Operas set in Scotland
Martyrdom in fiction